Chris Sauvé is a Canadian animator. He has done some directing, but works primarily as an animator. He has worked on several television shows (The Raccoons, The Ren & Stimpy Show, Futurama, Baby Blues, and My Life as a Teenage Robot) and films (The Iron Giant, Looney Tunes: Back in Action, Home on the Range, The Wild, and Mary Poppins Returns).

Career 
Christopher Sauvé grew up in Ontario, Canada just outside of Mississauga. At a young age, Sauvé received a book on the art of Disney Animation, which he obsessed over and began to use as reference to learn to draw. After high school, Sauvé attended Sheridan College where he began to study animation.

Since college, Sauvé began working primarily in television animation and animated films in Canada. Over the course of 30 years, he worked several different positions in the field of animation, including character animation, key animation, animation supervision, storyboard art, timing, and directing. Sauvé has worked for many major studios in the animation industry, including Nickelodeon, Warner Bros. Animation, Disney Television Animation, and Disney Feature Animation.

Directing credits

Futurama episodes 
"Fear of a Bot Planet" (co-directed with Peter Avanzino, Carlos Baeza and Ashley Lenz)
"The Lesser of Two Evils"
"The Problem with Popplers" (co-directed with Gregg Vanzo)

My Life as a Teenage Robot episodes 
"Hostile Makeover/Grid Iron Glory"
"Dressed To Kill/Shell Game"
"The Wonderful World of Wizzly/Call Hating"
"A Robot For All Seasons"
"Future Shock/Humiliation 101"
"Last Action Zero/Mind Over Matter"
"Love 'Em Or Leash 'Em/Teen Team Time"
"Pajama Party Prankapalooza/Sister Sledgehammer"
"Dancing with My Shell/Around the World in Eighty Pieces"
"Armagedroid/Killgore"
"A Pain In My Sidekick/Crash Pad Crash"
"Victim of Fashion"
"Designing Women/Robot Riot"
"Bradventure/Mama Drama"
"Toying with Jenny/Teenage Mutant Ninja Troubles"
"Weapons of Mass Distraction/There's No Place Like Home School"
"Teen Idol/Good Old Sheldon"

Filmography

Film

Television

Music Videos

Video Games

References

External links 

Chris Sauve's blog

1973 births
American animated film directors
American animators
Annie Award winners
Living people
Canadian television directors
American television directors
Canadian animated film directors
Canadian expatriates in the United States
Nickelodeon Animation Studio people
Walt Disney Animation Studios people